"Gravity" is the twelfth single by Japanese rock band Luna Sea, released on March 29, 2000. It was the band's sixth number one on the Oricon Singles Chart, and stayed on the chart for 12 weeks. In 2000, it was certified Gold by the RIAJ for sales over 200,000.

Overview
"Gravity" is a ballad-style song with a 16-beat rhythm, originally composed by Inoran. He described it as "even though released in spring, the lyrics actually create a strong expression of autumn." Its music video was directed by Shūichi Tan, who went on to direct the video for Luna Sea's next single, "Tonight".

"Inside You" is one of only two Luna Sea song originally written and composed by Shinya. "My Lover" was originally composed by Sugizo.

"Gravity" and "My Lover" were first performed during the Start Up Gig 2000, a live performance at Zepp Tokyo. Those songs were both used in the Japanese film Another Heaven, "Gravity" being its theme song. These songs were included on the film's first soundtrack, while an orchestrated version of "Gravity" was included on the second soundtrack as "Gravity on the Edge of the World".

A computer-generated portrait combining facial features from all five members is placed on the inner cover of this single, nicknamed "Tom", which also appears in their album Lunacy.

Track listing
All songs written and composed by Luna Sea.

"Gravity" - 4:37
"Inside You" - 4:21
"My Lover" - 4:16

Cover versions
"Gravity" has been covered live by Inoran himself during his solo career.

American pop rock singer Marié Digby also covered it for her 2009 album Second Home.

References

Luna Sea songs
Oricon Weekly number-one singles
2000 singles
Songs written for films
2000 songs
Universal Music Group singles
Japanese film songs